Michael Moyle may refer to:
 Michael Moyle (magistrate), magistrate and High Bailiff of the Isle of Man
 Michael Moyle (baseball), Australian baseball player
 Mike Moyle, member of the Idaho House of Representatives

See also
 Michael Moyles,  Gaelic footballer